The Mudeirej Bridge or Mdairej Bridge is a bridge in Lebanon. It was completed in 1998 as the tallest and highest bridge in Lebanon and the Middle East but this has since been surpassed. The bridge was built as part of Rafik Hariri's vision of rebuilding and developing Lebanon and its infrastructure. The bridge served as a connecting route for the Beirut-Damascus Highway aiming to improve the main road that links Syria's capital city Damascus, to Lebanon and its capital city Beirut.

Destruction 
On the 12th of July during the 2006 Lebanon-Israel conflict the Israeli Air force bombed the Mudeirej Bridge causing partial damage to its base and pillars, and critical damage to the road it uplifted. The destruction of the bridge which was a symbol of Lebanese architectural pride was considered by many in Lebanon to be unjustified because of the perceived low strategic value to the bridge in Israeli's conflict with Hezbollah. According to one observer of the bombing, “The bombing of this bridge, which is the pride of the Lebanese people, clearly proves that Israel is committed to destroying the infrastructure of the whole country. This bridge is not used by Hezbollah since it lies in a mountain resort area of Mount Lebanon, far away from the south of Lebanon."

In 2007, USAID announced that it would be involved in an extensive reconstruction of the bridge, due to Lebanon's political victory which put Israel and the United States in an awkward position in regards to the destruction and reconstruction of the bridge. USAID put forward US$30 million for the project.

Reconstruction work

References

External links
USAID 
ReliefWeb Report
USAID project document
Ponte sul Leontes

Bridges in Lebanon
2006 in Lebanon
2006 Lebanon War
Buildings and structures demolished in 2006
Demolished buildings and structures in Lebanon
Demolished bridges